The Crüxshadows  is an American dark wave and dark synthpop band currently based in Jacksonville, Florida, United States. The band has an international following of fans and has toured North America, Europe, and Asia.

History

The band was originally formed in 1992 by Rogue, Sean Flanagan and Tim Curry, in Tallahassee, Florida.

The Crüxshadows formed in 1992 in Tallahassee, Florida by Rogue (vocals, words, concepts, drum-machines, songsmithing, & electric violins), Sean Flanagan (computers, drum machines, programming, and synthesis), and Tim Curry (computers, programming, equipment, & guitar work) during the summer.

The Crüxshadows self-released their debut album, ...night crawls in in 1993, initially only as a cassette.

In 1994 the Crüxshadows recorded and released ″Ballrooms on Mars″ on Old School Records and re-recorded "Bloodline" from their '93 release.

In 1995 the band recorded their second album Telemetry of a Fallen Angel. Initially it was simply a self released CD, but it was acquired and released by Nesak International/Kato Records, and later released and distributed by Dancing Ferret Discs. Years later it would be acquired by Rogue's own label Wishfire Records.

Telemetry of a Fallen Angel was released nationally in the United States in 1996.

In 1997 both Sean Flanagan and Tim Curry left the band shortly after signing a record deal with Nesak International/KATO Records. Rogue absorbed their interest in the band as well as their commitments under the new contract, and became the only member of Crüxshadows for a time.  Determined to not be dragged down by the comings and goings of other members, Rogue learned to use synthesizers and computers himself to maintain Cruxshadows' musical direction.

Rogue started working on new material for the band's follow-up album in 1998.  He recruited several new players including Chris Brantley, Kevin Page, Rachel McDonnell, and Trevor Brown.  The band resumed touring nationally and finished work on their third studio album.  During this period The Cruxshadows signed an ill-fated deal with New England-based Mere Mortal Records to release The Mystery of the Whisper.  A few months prior to putting out the disc, Mere Mortal was forced out of business due in part to its acquisition of a debt-heavy distributor.  With a new album, but no label, The Cruxshadows eventually partnered with Patrick Rodgers' startup label Dancing Ferret Discs. The Cruxshadows would spend a little more than a decade signed to Dancing Ferret.

In 1999, with their new label and a new lineup, the band released The Mystery of the Whisper,  Until the Voices Fade..., and Paradox Addendum. By this time "Marilyn My Bitterness" and "Monsters" had become staples on the dance floors of a re-invigorated American Gothic-Industrial club scene. Capitalizing on the success of these songs, the band toured the United States relentlessly over the years that followed.  The band's song "Eurydice" occupied the top position in the category of New Wave for several months on the charts of digital music pioneer MP3.com.

In 2000 the band contributed a song titled "Deception" to Music from the Succubus Club, a disc sponsored by and based upon the popular whitewolf Vampire The Masquerade franchise. This song was also released in a German language version titled "Täuschung". Although "Deception" never charted, it became one of the band's most popular and enduring tracks.

They played their first tour of Europe in 2001 and released a tour CD for their European live shows called Intercontinental Drift, later released as Echoes and Artifacts.

In 2002 the EP Tears debuted at No 5 in the Deutsche Alternative Charts. The full length album Wishfire also placed at No. 2 on the DAC.  The Crüxshadows toured both North America and Europe in support of their new album.

Ethernaut was released in 2003 featuring another fan favorite song "Winterborn" which also landed at No. 2 on the Deutsch Alternative Charts in Germany. The Crüxshadows Continued touring both in the USA and throughout Europe.

The Crüxshadows released a remix disc in 2004 based on the material on the Ethernaut CD called Fortress in Flames and followed it up with yet another tour of the United States and Europe.

In 2005 the release of Shadowbox, a live DVD / CD-EP, followed the Crüxshadows on their tour of Europe and featured their headlining performance at the Wave Gothic Treffen in Leipzig Germany.

In 2006 the single release of "Sophia" saw its debut land at No. 1 on the Billboard Hot Dance Singles Sales chart and at No. 7 on the Hot 100 Singles Sales chart. This was a major breakthrough according to Rogue.  Its release coincided with the band's performance at 2006's Dragon*Con, where the Rogue gave credit to the support of their SciFi fans in attendance for helping them reach the No. 1 position, unseating the mainstream artist Beyonce from the top position. Jen Jawidzik joined the Crüxshadows, taking over keyboards.  The Crüxshadows recorded the song "Wake the White Queen" for the Neil Gaiman curated CD Wheres Neil When You Need Him celebrating the author's written works.

In 2007 the full-length concept album Dreamcypher was released. The single "Birthday" debuted at No. 1 on the Billboard Dance Singles Sales Chart.  The band spent almost the entirety of 2007 touring.  Their travels took them to China where they played the MIDI Modern Music Festival, one of China's largest Rock music events taking place in Beijing, China in May. Following a year long DreamCypher tour, Rachel McDonnell, George Bikos, and Sarah Poulos all left the group as 2007 drew to a close, and Rogue soon replaced them with guitarist Valerie Gentile, violinist JoHanna Moresco, & violinist David Russel Wood, as well as dancer Sarah Stewart (aka Sarah Kilgore).

In 2008 the EP "Immortal" was released in July on Rogue's birthday, and became the band's third consecutive single to chart on Billboard, coming in at No. 2 in the United States and landing in the top 5 in Germany.

In 2009 Valerie Gentile was briefly replaced by Cassandra Luger before guitarist Mike Perez took over guitar duties in early 2010 The Crüxshadows would continue to play to bigger audiences in Europe, but 2009 marked the last tour in the United States until several US mini-tours in 2018 and 2019.  The EP "Quicksilver" debuted at No. 32 on the Billboard U.S. Hot 100 Singles Sales chart before eventually peaking at the No. 2 position on the Billboard singles chart, and the No. 1 position on the Billboard Dance Chart.

During 2010–2011  the Crüxshadows performed a tour of Europe, but took a year off in 2011 as frontman Rogue and his wife Jessica gave birth to their daughter, Anmi.  2011 Dragoncon was the one and only performance of the band that year.  During this time the band had relocated to Jacksonville from Tallahassee, Florida, and Rogue and his crew focused on producing another new album.

The Crüxshadows returned to the road in 2012 and As the Dark Against My Halo became the first Crüxshadows disc to earn a number one position on the German Alternative Charts.

In 2013 Rogue acquired control of the Crüxshadows' artistic works and transferred them to his own label, Wishfire Records.  Dancing Ferret and the Crüxshadows released a joint statement notifying the public that the long-time allies were going separate ways. The band toured Europe in support of their As the Dark Against My Halo album.

During 2014–2016 Rogue teamed up with Fansation in Germany, a label that released its acts through its partnership with Universal Music, and began working with notable German producer Henning Verlage.  During this time, Rogue traveled back and forth to Germany writing, recording, and producing The Crüxshadows' new album.  The band performed a very limited number of shows but played several high-profile concerts and festivals including several performances supporting notable label bandmates Unheilig as part of their farewell concerts, including two sold-out outdoor concerts in Leipzig in front of the massive Völkerschlachtdenkmal War Memorial.  Helios peaked on the Billboard singles chart at the No. 11 position in the USA and later in 2017 the single dominated the German Alternative Charts, camping out at the No. 1 position for months.

In 2017, following its lead single Helios, The Crüxshadows released a new concept album called "Astromythology", which tells the story of an astronaut escaping the destruction of the solar system.  Every song represents a planetary body, and the album as a whole becomes an allegory of life changing realities.  The album became The Crüxshadows' most popular German release and its first two singles reached number one on the DAC as well as top 10 showings in the mainstream charts.
Despite the success of Astromythology, in the wake of declining record sales throughout the industry, the administrators of Fansation and its related companies returned The Crüxshadows rights to Rogue and parted ways.

In 2018 The Crüxshadows once again picked up the pieces and released Astromythology in Europe through the album's previous distributor, Timezone Records, and in the rest of the world through their own Wishfire Records imprint.  "Home", a touching ballad about love lost, reached the No. 2 position on the German charts and features The Crüxshadows' highest-budget video to date.

On July 3, 2022 The Crüxshadows released a new single, "All the White Horses (Into the Mirror Darkly)" available for download through their website. The Crüxshadows are scheduled to perform at DragonCon (Atlanta, GA) Sep. 1 - 5, 2022. https://www.dragoncon.org/people-to-see-2/performers/#C

Labels
The Crüxshadows initially self-released two albums under the imprint name Black Widow Music between 1992 and 1996. Those titles were ...Night Crawls In and Telemetry of a Fallen Angel. In 1997, they signed a deal with Nesak International/Kado Records to give Telemetry of a Fallen Angel a full commercial release, as well as an option for a future album. Nesak eventually sold their rights to Dancing Ferret Discs and Mere Mortal Records. Mere Mortal Records went out of business prior to releasing any albums by The Crüxshadows. Dancing Ferret Discs released a number of The Crüxshadows titles over the following ten years. In July 2008, Dancing Ferret Discs announced that it was becoming a catalog label and while existing titles would remain in print, the label would not be releasing new albums. Rather than sign a deal with another label, The Crüxshadows started their own label in mid-2009, in cooperation with several established labels and distributors in different markets worldwide. Their new label was named Wishfire Records and their first release was "Quicksilver", which hit the shelves in the USA on September 8, 2009. The song became their fourth consecutive single to reach the top 10 on the Billboard Hot Dance Singles Charts, and their third to occupy the No. 1 position.

Touring
From 1993 to 1997 The Crüxshadows toured the Eastern portion of the United States.  From 1998 until 2008 The band played shows throughout the entirety of the United States and made several trips into Mexico and Canada.  In 2001 The Crüxshadows began touring Europe on a regular basis. They also played in various festivals with bands like Bella Morte, Noctivagus, The Ghost of Lemora for example.

In 2007, they were invited to play at the Midi Music Festival in Beijing, China.

In 2009, 2010, & 2015 the band performed on the Gothic Cruise.

Through much of their history, the band has toured the festival circuit in Europe. After The Immortal Tour, from 2008 to 2018, the band played only a very limited number of shows North America, however they have performed annually without fail in Atlanta at DragonCon from 1997-2019, only pausing for the Coronavirus outbreak, and played only the occasional appearance or festival in the United States otherwise, until 2018, when they began performing shows in support of their Astromythology Album.

Lyrics and concepts
Much of The Crüxshadows' music is based on Greek and Egyptian mythology, including symbolic references to a number of mythical figures, and many of their lyrics deal with the concept of God.

References in popular culture
References to the band or the band's music appear in the writings by authors Caitlín R. Kiernan, Sherrilyn Kenyon, and John Ringo.

The Crüxshadows name and likeness have occurred as cameos or background in comic books like Vertigo/DC Comics' The Dreaming, video games, television shows like CSI, and cartoon strips.

Members
 "Rogue" (Virgil Roger du Pont III) – lead vocals, violin, programming, keyboards, songwriter, lyrics, concepts, creative director, leader, producer.
 Jen "Pyromantic" Jawidzik – live synths, backing vocals
 JoHanna Moresco – violin, backing vocals
 David Russell Wood – violin, backing vocals
 Jessica Lackey – live E-drums, backing vocals, former dancer
 Rachel "Victoria" Whitford – guitars

Former or non-active members
 Jenne Vermes – dancer, backing vocals
 Cassandra Luger – guitars
 Valerie Gentile – guitars, backing vocals
 Rachel McDonnell – keyboards, violin
 Stacey Campbell – guitars, vocals
 George Bikos – guitars
 Tim Curry  – guitars
 Kevin Page – guitars
 Chris Brantley – keyboards, vocals
 Trevor Brown – keyboards
 Sean Flanagan – keyboards
 Nick Bottom – keyboards
 Beth Allen – dancer
 Holly McCall – dancer, backing vocals
 Rachel Ulrich – dancer
 Sarah Poulos – dancer, backing vocals
 Sarah Stewart – dancer, backing vocals
 Holly Hasty – dancer, backing vocals
 Nichole Tadlock – dancer, backing vocals
 Stephanie Griffith – violin, backing vocals.
 Stacia Marian – dancer, backing vocals
 Ally Knight – dancer, backing vocals
 Mike Perez – guitars

Related projects
 Spider Lilies is fronted by Stacey Campbell
 The Labyrinth fronted by Sarah Stewart, who has also played drums for Ayria
 Sapphire Rebellion fronted by Crüxshadows' former guitarist Tim Curry.
 Angelspit has included both Valerie Gentile and George Bikos
 Black Tape for a Blue Girl and Abbey Death have both featured Valerie Gentile, who has also recorded solo synthpop work.
 Former Cruxshadows backup dancer Jenne Vermes is the head of the tap dance troupe Noise Complaint.

Discography

Albums

EPs and singles

DVDs

Chart peak positions
 No. 5 "Tears" – (Germany (DAC)Deutsche Alternative Charts) – 2002 Singles Charts
 No. 2 "Wishfire" – (Germany (DAC)Deutsche Alternative Charts) – 2002, Album Charts
 No. 2 "Ethernaut" – (Germany (DAC)Deutsche Alternative Charts) – 2003, Album Charts
 No. 1 "Sophia" – (US Hot Dance Singles Sales) – Issue Date: 2006-09-23
 No. 7 "Sophia" – (US Hot 100 Singles Sales) – Issue Date: 2006-09-23
 No. 1 "Birthday" – (US Hot Dance Singles Sales) – Issue Date: 2007-09-22
 No. 2 "Birthday" – (US Hot 100 Singles Sales) – Issue Date: 2007-09-22
 No. 23 "Sophia" – (US Hot 100 Singles Sales) – Issue Date: 2007-09-22
 No. 2 "Immortal" – (US Hot Dance Singles Sales) – Issue Date: 2008-09-11
 No. 6 "Immortal" – (US Hot 100 Singles Sales) – Issue Date: 2008-09-11
 No. 7 "Quicksilver" – (US Hot Dance Singles Sales) – Issue Date: 2009-09-26
 No. 32 "Quicksilver" – (US Hot 100 Singles Sales) – Issue Date: 2009-09-26
 No. 1 "Quicksilver" – (US Hot Dance Singles Sales) – Issue Date: 2009-11-21
 No. 2 "Quicksilver" – (US Hot 100 Singles Sales) – Issue Date: 2009-11-21
 No. 1 "As the Dark Against My Halo" – (Germany (DAC) Deutsche Alternative Charts) – Week 48, 2012, Album Charts
 No. 11 "Helios" – (US Hot 100 Singles Sales) – Issue Date: 2016
 No. 1 "Astromythology" – (Germany (DAC)Deutsche Alternative Charts) – Sept 2017, Album Charts
 No. 1 "Helios" – (Germany (DAC)Deutsche Alternative Charts) – Jan 2017, Singles Charts
 No. 1 "Helios" – (Germany Native25) – Feb 2017, Singles Charts
 No. 1 "Singularities" – (Germany (DAC)Deutsche Alternative Charts) – Sept 2017, Singles Charts
 No. 2 "Home" – (Germany (DAC)Deutsche Alternative Charts) – Jan 2018, Singles Charts

References

External links

 Official website
 Official German website
 
 Cruxshadows Reverbnation

Rock music groups from Florida
Musical groups from Tallahassee, Florida
American dark wave musical groups
American gothic rock groups
Musical groups established in 1992